The Sun Fast 31 is a French sailboat that was designed by Daniel Andrieu as a cruiser-racer and first built in 1991.

The Sun Fast 31 is part of the Sun Fast sailboat range.

The design is a development of the Sun Odyssey 31 and the Sun Light 30.

Production
The design was built by Jeanneau in France, from 1991 to 1994, with 130 boats completed, but it is now out of production.

Design
The Sun Fast 31 is a recreational keelboat, built predominantly of fiberglass, with wood trim. It has a 7/8 fractional sloop, with a deck-stepped mast, two sets of swept spreaders and aluminum spars with discontinuous stainless steel wire rigging. The hull has a raked stem, a reverse transom with a swimming platform, an internally mounted spade-type rudder controlled by a tiller and a fixed fin keel, deep draft keel or optional shoal-draft keel. The "performance" fin keel model displaces  and carries  of lead ballast. The deep draft keel  and shoal draft models displace  and carry  of cast iron ballast.

The design was built with two interior arrangements, designated "owners" and "team". The owners layout has sleeping accommodation for four people, with a double "V"-berth in the bow cabin, a "U"-shaped settee around a table in the main cabin and an aft cabin with a double berth on the port side. The galley is located on the port side admidships. The galley has a straight layout and is equipped with a two-burner stove, an ice box and a sink. A navigation station is aft the galley, on the port side. The head is located beside the companionway ladder on the starboard side.

The team cabin version has sleeping accommodation for six people, with a double "V"-berth in the bow cabin, two straight settees in the main cabin and an aft cabin with a double berth on the port side. The galley is located on the port side just forward of the companionway ladder. The galley is "L"-shaped and is equipped with a two-burner stove, an ice box and a sink. A navigation station is opposite the galley, on the starboard side. The head is located beside the companionway ladder on the starboard side.

Operational history
The boat was at one time supported by a class club that organized racing events, the Sun Fast Association.

See also
List of sailing boat types

References

External links

Keelboats
1990s sailboat type designs
Sailing yachts
Sailboat type designs by Daniel Andrieu
Sailboat types built by Jeanneau